Meryce Mussa Emmanuel is a former Member of Parliament in the National Assembly of Tanzania, elected in 2005 for the Civic United Front party.

References

Living people
Civic United Front MPs
Year of birth missing (living people)
Place of birth missing (living people)
Tanzanian MPs 2005–2010